is a private coeducational junior college in the city of Wakaba-ku, Chiba, Chiba Prefecture Japan, established in 1999.

Names of Academic department 
 Regional welfare
 Major of Personal care studies
 Major of Special education studies

Advanced course 
 Major of Parsonal care studies
 Major of Special education studies

External links
 Official website 

Educational institutions established in 1999
Private universities and colleges in Japan
Universities and colleges in Chiba Prefecture
Japanese junior colleges
1999 establishments in Japan